Galliavola is a comune (municipality) in the Province of Pavia in the Italian region Lombardy, located about 50 km southwest of Milan and about 30 km southwest of Pavia. As of 31 December 2004, it had a population of 230 and an area of 8.5 km².

Galliavola borders the following municipalities: Ferrera Erbognone, Lomello, Pieve del Cairo, Villa Biscossi.

Demographic evolution

Gallery

References

Cities and towns in Lombardy